Ancistrus dolichopterus, one of the Ancistrus species called the bushymouth catfish, is a species of armored catfish native to Brazil. It is found in middle Amazon basin and in the basins of the Rio Negro, the lower Trombetas, the Tefé, the Madeira and the Tapajós Rivers. This species grows to a length of  SL. This species is found in the aquarium trade.

References

External links
 

Ancistrus
Fish of South America
Fish of Brazil
Fish described in 1854